This is a comprehensive discography of official recordings by Tantric, an American rock band from Louisville, Kentucky. Tantric has released 8 studio albums, 1 Compilation albums, 18 singles, 8 Promotional Singles.

Studio albums

Singles

Music videos

References

Discographies of American artists
Rock music group discographies